Pagan Babies is a 2000 crime novel written by Elmore Leonard. He first used Pagan Babies as the name of a rock band in his 1981 novel Split Images.

Plot summary

The novel begins in Rwanda. The protagonist is a priest named Terry Dunn. It is a few years after the genocide of the Tutsis by the Hutus.

Father Terry lives in Rwanda with his girlfriend Chantelle. He doesn't have qualms about substituting punishment for penance. If that means killing four Hutu murderers who slaughtered his Tutsi congregation, so be it. After being an instrument of divine wrath, Dunn breaks camp and heads for Detroit. He wants to raise money for 'Pagan Babies' — the children orphaned during the genocide.
 
Dunn's brother Fran specializes in lawsuits for personal injuries. He is helping Debbie, a woman who spent three years in jail for deliberately hitting her ex-husband Randy with a Ford Escort. Debbie is trying to have a career as a comedian.
In the meantime we learn more about Terry's past and his problems with the IRS, which was the reason for his fleeing to Rwanda to help his uncle.

Debbie's ex-husband Randy now owns a restaurant and is involved with some of the same gangsters that Terry once knew. Debbie and Terry begin a relationship. Randy stole sixty-seven thousand dollars from Debbie and now it's only a matter of time before Debbie's desire for cold, hard cash and Terry's fundraising for Rwandan orphans join forces in a carefully plotted financial assault on Randy. They want to receive a donation of 250,000 dollars from Tony Amilia, the local wise guy, for the 'Pagan Babies'. In Randy's restaurant all of the local wise guys, hit men, and scam artists twist and twirl around each other for the money and for their lives.

Characters in Pagan Babies
Fr. Terry Dunn – Father
Fran Dunn – Terry's brother
Mary Pat – Fran's wife
Chantelle – Terry's Rwandan girlfriend
Laurent Kamweya – RPA officer
Tony Amilia – local wise guy
Johnny Pajonny – Terry's former crime partner
Vincent Moraco – Detroit wise guy
Debbie Dewey – ex-con and Terry's girlfriend
Randy Agley – Debbie's ex-husband
Searcy J Bragg Jr aka "The Mutt" – hit man

External links
Pagan Babies at Elmore Leonard.com

2000 American novels
Neo-noir novels
Novels by Elmore Leonard
Novels set in Rwanda
Novels set in Detroit
Books with cover art by Chip Kidd